Antarctospira is a genus of sea snails, marine gastropod mollusks in the family Borsoniidae.

Species
Species within the genus Antarctospira include:
 Antarctospira angusteplicata (Strebel, 1905)
 Antarctospira badenpowelli (Dell, 1990)
 Antarctospira falklandica (Powell, 1951)
 Antarctospira mawsoni (Powell, 1958)
 Antarctospira principalis (Thiele, 1912)
Species brought into synonymy
 Antarctospira paragenota (Powell, 1951): synonym of Antarctospira angusteplicata (Strebel, 1905)

References

External links
 Kantor Y.I., Harasewych M.G. & Puillandre N. (2016). A critical review of Antarctic Conoidea (Neogastropoda). Molluscan Research. 36(3): 153-206

 
Gastropod genera